Spring Garden is a village in the region of Pomeroon-Supenaam of Guyana.

Spring Garden is located on the Essequibo coast, next to Good Hope village. It is two villages away from Supenaam. The population consists of mostly East Indians.

References

Populated places in Pomeroon-Supenaam